Nicolaas Gerard Pierson (7 February 1839 – 24 December 1909) was a Dutch economist and Liberal statesman who served as the chairman of the Council of Ministers (Prime Minister) of the Netherlands from 1897 until 1901.

Pierson was a professor economics and statistics at the University of Amsterdam and director and presiding director (president-directeur) of the De Nederlandsche Bank, the Dutch national bank. He was minister of Finance in the Cabinet Van Tienhoven. During his term of office he introduced  an important tax revision. After serving as chairman of the Council of Ministers for four years he took a seat in the House of Representatives for the constituency of Gorinchem from 1905 to 1909. Pierson received an honorary doctorate from the University of Cambridge.

Early life and education
Nicolaas Gerard Pierson was born in Amsterdam on 7 February 1839, to Jan Lodewijk Gregory Pierson and his wife Ida Oyens. The youngest of six children, Pierson had two brothers and three sisters. Two of his brothers, Allard and Hendrik Pierson, would become famous pastors. His father was a merchant, while his mother was a Réveil writer.

Pierson attended a French school in Amsterdam from 1845 to 1853. He went to an English school in Brussels in 1853, but switched to a trade school in Amsterdam a year later. On 2 June 1864, Pierson graduated as a teacher in political economy.

Career
Pierson started his career as a merchant. He worked in his father's glass shop from 1860 to 1861, and owned a business selling colonial goods, Beckman en Pierson, from 1861 to 1864. Shortly before his graduation, on 1 April 1864, he became chief executive of De Surinaamsche Bank, and director of De Nederlandsche Bank on 1 June 1868. On 15 January 1885, he was appointed as President of De Nederlandsche Bank by Royal Decree. He took office 1 February the same year, and kept his position until 21 Augustus 1891. Aside from his career in the financial sector, he also taught political economy at a trade school in Amsterdam from 1864 to 1868, and political economy and statistics at the University of Amsterdam from 1877 and 1885. Pierson's main two economist texts were Grondbeginselen der Staathuiskunde and Leerboek der Staathuiskunde, the latter being translated into English and Italian. In 1883 Pierson became member of the Royal Netherlands Academy of Arts and Sciences.

Pierson served as minister of Finance from 21 August 1891 to 9 May 1894, and again from 26 July 1897 to 1 August 1901. During his second his second term as minister, he was also the chairman of the Council of Ministers, a positional that would later be dubbed Prime Minister of the Netherlands. During his time as minister, he reformed the corporate and capital tax systems, and was instrumental in the establishment of Statistics Netherlands, the national statistical office. On 26 July 1905, Pierson was elected into the House of Representatives for the constituency of Gorinchem. He did not seek election in 1909, giving up his seat on 1 August.

A progressive liberal, Pierson presided over a wide range of reforms as prime minister. Measures were enacted in education, worker safety, and health, with the government “breaking with past traditions in, amongst other things, making vaccinations compulsory and regulating the water supply to combat the outbreak of infectious diseases.” A series of factory acts were passed to strengthen and expand on demands laid down in a previous act from 1895, while local authorities were compelled “to establish minimum requirements for safe housing.” In addition, accident insurance was made mandatory for all industrial workers by a 1901 act.

Socialist calculation debate
Pierson is credited with an important role in the Socialist calculation debate, when he criticised Karl Kautsky, who had delivered a speech in Delft in 1902. Entitled The Problem of Value in the Socialist Community, this attracted little attention outside the Netherlands until it appeared in English translation in Friedrich Hayek's Collectivist Economic Planning, (1935).

Family
On 30 October 1862, Pierson married Catharina Rutgera Waller in Amsterdam. She died shortly after their marriage, and the couple remained childless.
Pierson died on 24 December 1909, in Heemstede.

References

External links
 

1839 births
1909 deaths
Businesspeople from Amsterdam
Liberal Union (Netherlands) politicians
Presidents of the Central Bank of the Netherlands
Prime Ministers of the Netherlands
Ministers of Finance of the Netherlands
Members of the House of Representatives (Netherlands)
Members of the Royal Netherlands Academy of Arts and Sciences
Dutch bankers
Dutch members of the Dutch Reformed Church